Walter Davies  (born 1863) was a Welsh international footballer. He was part of the Wales national football team, playing 1 match on 9 February 1884 against Ireland.

See also
 List of Wales international footballers (alphabetical)

References

1863 births
Welsh footballers
Wales international footballers
Wrexham A.F.C. players
Place of birth missing
Date of death missing
Association football defenders